Agononida is a genus of squat lobsters in the family Munididae, containing the following species:

 Agononida aequabilis Macpherson, 2006
 Agononida africerta Poore & Andreakis, 2012
 Agononida alisae Macpherson, 1999
 Agononida analoga (Macpherson, 1993)
 Agononida andrewi (Macpherson, 1994)
 Agononida auscerta Poore & Andreakis, 2012
 Agononida callirrhoe (Macpherson, 1994)
 Agononida eminens (Baba, 1988)
 Agononida emphereia Macpherson, 1997
 Agononida fortiantennata (Baba, 1988)
 Agononida garciai Macpherson, 2004
 Agononida imitata Macpherson, 2006
 Agononida incerta (Henderson, 1888)
 Agononida indocerta Poore & Andreakis, 2012
 Agononida isabelensis Cabezas, Macpherson & Machordom, 2009
 Agononida laurentae (Macpherson, 1994)
 Agononida longipes (A. Milne Edwards, 1880)
 Agononida longispinata (Baba, 1988)
 Agononida madagascerta Poore & Andreakis, 2014
 Agononida marini (Macpherson, 1994)
 Agononida nielbrucei Vereshchaka, 2005
 Agononida norfocerta Poore & Andreakis, 2012
 Agononida normani (Henderson, 1885)
 Agononida ocyrhoe (Macpherson, 1994)
 Agononida pilosimanus (Baba, 1969)
 Agononida polycerta Poore & Andreakis, 2014
 Agononida procera Ahyong & Poore, 2004
 Agononida prolixa (Alcock, 1894)
 Agononida rubrizonata Macpherson & Baba, 2009
 Agononida sabatesae (Macpherson, 1994)
 Agononida schroederi (Chace, 1939)
 Agononida similis (Baba, 1988)
 Agononida simillima Macpherson, 2006
 Agononida soelae (Baba, 1986)
 Agononida sphecia (Macpherson, 1994)
 Agononida spinicordata (Henderson, 1885)
 Agononida squamosa (Henderson, 1885)
 Agononida tasmancerta Poore & Andreakis, 2014
 Agononida tenuipes (Miyake & Baba, 1967)
 Agononida vanuacerta Poore & Andreakis, 2014
 Agononida variabilis (Baba, 1988)

References

Squat lobsters